Brown State Fishing Lake (sometimes also known as Brown State Fishing Lake And Wildlife Area) is a protected area in Brown County, Kansas in the United States. The lake is 62 acres (0.25 km2) in area and up to 13 feet (4 m) deep. The area was formerly known as Brown County State Park, and is 8 miles (13 km) east of Hiawatha, Kansas.

References

Protected areas of Brown County, Kansas
Kansas state fishing lakes
Bodies of water of Brown County, Kansas
Reservoirs in Kansas